Yarda was a Palestinian hamlet in the Safad Subdistrict. It was depopulated during the 1947–1949 Palestine war. It was located 10.5 km northeast of Safad. The area is now part of Israel.

History
Khirbat Waqqas was located west-northwest of Yarda, and is recognised as the place the Canaanites referred to as Hazor.  Victor Guérin  found at Kh. Waqqas in 1875:  'Near a small enclosure, in the centre of which is a broken column consecrated to a santon, are shown the remains of an edifice oriented east and west, once probably a church. It was ornamented with monolithic columns in ordinary limestone, some broken pieces of which are still lying about. Other similar fragments are found in the neighbouring houses. Here and there I remarked cut stones, which no doubt belonged to this monument. A little to the south, a hillock is also covered with ruins of houses.' In 1881,  the PEF's Survey of Western Palestine (SWP)  found at Kh. Wakkas only cattle-sheds.

Yarda itself was located at a place called Kh el Loziyeh in the late Ottoman era. In 1881, the SWP found here: "Caves and ruined  cattle sheds".

British Mandate era
In the  1931 census of Palestine,  conducted by the British Mandate authorities,  Yarda had a  population of 13  Muslims, in a total of 3 houses.

In the 1945 statistics, the population was 20 Muslims, who owned 1,367 dunams of land.  Of this, 1,359 dunams were used for cereals, while 8 dunams were classified as un-cultivable area.

Post 1948
After Yarda became depopulated, Ayyelet ha-Shahar took over some of the village land, while in 1949 Mishmar ha-Yarden was also settled on village land.

In 1992 the village site was described: "The truncated walls of some houses still stand, as well as those of a khan, or caravansary. The site is strewn with stones from crumbled houses.  A portion of the land is used as pasture."

References

Bibliography

 

 (p.  122)

External links
 Welcome to Yarda
 Yarda,  Zochrot
 Yarda,  Villages of Palestine
Survey of Western Palestine, map 4: IAA, Wikimedia commons
 Yarda,  at Khalil Sakakini Cultural Center

Arab villages depopulated during the 1948 Arab–Israeli War
District of Safad